Strathroy may refer to:

 Strathroy, a suburb of Omagh in Tyrone County, Northern Ireland, and municipalities named after it, including:
 Strathroy-Caradoc, Ontario, Canada
 Strathroy, located in KwaZulu-Natal province in South Africa